An aristocrat is typically a member of landed social class with inherited titles, heraldry and privileges.

Aristocrat and aristocracy can also refer to:

Books, Theatre, Film and TV
 Aristocrats, a 1979 play by Brian Friel
 Aristocrats: Caroline, Emily, Louisa, and Sarah Lennox, a novel by Stella Tillyard
 "The Aristocrats", a famous joke most often told by comedians to comedians
 The Aristocrats (film), a 2005 documentary film about the joke
 Aristocrats (TV series), a 1999 BBC television miniseries
 The Aristocrats (comics), (Italian Gli Aristocratici) an Italian comic book series
 The Aristocats, a 1970 animated film by Disney

Music
 Aristocrat Records, label active from 1947 to 1951, renamed to Chess Records
 The Aristocrats (band), a rock supergroup
 The Aristocrats (album), an eponymous album
"Aristocrat", song by Nü Sensae 
"Aristocrat", song by New Politics (band) written by Sam Hollander
"Aristocrat", song by Poppy from Am I a Girl?

Organisations
 Fredrikstad F.K., a Norwegian football club nicknamed "The Aristocrats"
 The Aristocrat restaurant chain, founded by chef Engracia Cruz-Reyes in Manila, the Philippines
 Aristocrat Leisure, a slot machine manufacturer

Other
 Aristocrat (fashion), a fashion style from Japan
 Aristocrat, a liquor brand marketed by Heaven Hill

See also
 Aristocracy, a form of government